Trash Generator is the fourth studio album by American band Tera Melos. It was released in August 2017 under Sargent House.

Track listing

References

2017 albums
Sargent House albums